The Miserable Rich are a chamber pop band, formed in 2007 and based in Brighton, England. The band has a chamber orchestra sound, created using cello and violin as the primary lead instruments, augmented by double bass, acoustic guitar and occasionally piano. They have released three albums: Twelve Ways to Count (2008), Of Flight & Fury (2010) and Miss You in the Days (2011); and a live album, Live in Frankfurt (2014).

The band's name came from an experience Will Calderbank and James de Malplaquet had at the wedding of two rich aristocrats.

History
In 2006, Will Calderbank (cello) joined James de Malplaquet (vocals) to form the band Grape Authority, a live band playing the songs de Malplaquet had written under the pseudonym James Grape. The pair were playing in Brighton folk band Shoreline, and the more traditional instrumentation used in this band was taken on board, with inspiration derived from the ex-Zombie Colin Blunstone's "Say You Don't Mind" and The Balanescu Quartet's Kraftwerk covers. Together with Mike Siddell (formerly Hope of the States) on violin, Ricky Pritchard on guitar and Rhys Lovell playing double bass, they created The Miserable Rich.

They recorded their debut album, Twelve Ways to Count, at de Malplaquet's house in Hove during the summer of 2007. The debut single from the album received positive reviews, including Leftfield Single of the Month in DJ Magazine and widespread airplay, with the band championed in particular by BBC 6 Music's Marc Riley, for whom they have recorded two live sessions. The album itself has received widespread critical acclaim, both in Germany and the UK.

They have toured extensively in Europe, both as headliners and as support for Isobel Campbell and Mark Lanegan.

In November 2009 they released an EP of cover versions, featuring four reworked 1980s songs: "Golden Brown" by The Stranglers, "Gigantic" by Pixies, "Shades" by Iggy Pop and "Sweet Dreams (Are Made of This)" by Eurythmics.

The Miserable Rich self-recorded and produced their second album, Of Flight & Fury, which was mixed by Al Scott, who had previously worked with The Levellers, Eliza Carthy and Asian Dub Foundation, and released in June 2010.

The third Miserable Rich album, Miss You in the Days, released in November 2011, is lyrically based on ghost stories. It was recorded on location at various buildings around the UK that are reputedly haunted, primarily Blickling Hall in Norfolk.

In late 2012 The Miserable Rich announced their final concerts in London and Brighton, pending a creative break during which time members of the band will concentrate on other projects. However, they released a Christmas single in 2013 titled "Everything You Wanted". In November 2014, their live album Live in Frankfurt was released featuring music from their gig at the city on 9 February 2012.

Discography
Twelve Ways to Count (2008, Humble Soul)
Covers EP (2009, Humble Soul)
Of Flight & Fury (2010, Humble Soul)
Miss You in the Days (2011, Humble Soul / Hazelwood Records)
Miss You More EP (2012)
Live in Frankfurt (2014)

References

External links

Interview with James De Malplaquet of The Miserable Rich (2010)
A–Z of Miss You in the Days article

British indie pop groups
Musical groups from Brighton and Hove